Lieutenant General Myo Zaw Thein is a former Burmese military officer and vice-chair of the Union Solidarity and Development Party, the Burmese military's proxy political party.

Military career 
Myo Zaw Thein graduated from the 28th batch of the Defence Services Academy. He was appointed to become the military's adjutant general in July 2019, and previously served as the commander for the Yangon Command and the Bureau of Special Operations No. 5.  In October 2022, he retired from the Burmese armed forces to succeed Khin Yi as vice-chair in the military's proxy political party, the Union Solidarity and Development Party.

See also 

 2021–2023 Myanmar civil war
 State Administration Council
 Tatmadaw

References 

Living people
Burmese generals
Defence Services Academy alumni
Union Solidarity and Development Party politicians
Year of birth missing (living people)